Roger Reece Kibbe (May 21, 1939 – February 28, 2021) was an American serial killer and rapist known as the "I-5 Strangler". 
Kibbe found all but one of his victims on freeways around Sacramento, California. In 1991 he was sentenced to 25 years to life imprisonment for the death of Darcie Frackenpohl.

Criminal investigation and incarceration 
Kibbe was arrested in 1988 for murdering Darcie Frackenpohl the previous year. He was convicted of first degree murder and sentenced to 25 years to life in prison. In 2003, he accompanied prosecutors and detectives to a dry creek he remembered to try to find the body of Lou Ellen Burleigh, whom he had killed in 1977. In 2007 a detective searched the area again. In 2009, Kibbe again returned to the site with detectives. Burleigh's body was not found, and a grand jury was convened.

After a plea bargain to avoid the death penalty, on November 5, 2009, Kibbe was sentenced to an additional six life sentences, this time for the deaths of the remaining.

In 2011, a detective returned to the Burleigh dump site on his own and found a bone in the creek. DNA testing proved it to be Burleigh's. Burleigh had left her Walnut Creek, California, home in 1977 for a job interview, but never returned.

Kibbe kidnapped his victims, tied them up with parachute rigging cord and silenced them with duct tape. He then proceeded to cut open their clothes in irregular shapes with scissors that had belonged to his mother. Sometimes he garroted his victims with the parachute cord with which he skydived. Then, he raped them and strangled them to death. Kibbe also cut off most of the hair of his victims to remove the duct tape before leaving the scene of the crime.

Death 
Kibbe died at approximately 12:40 a.m. on February 28, 2021, in Mule Creek State Prison.

An officer made the discovery; Jason Budrow (cellmate), 40, was present at the scene. Budrow, a self-avowed Satanist who was serving a life sentence for strangling a woman to death in 2010, claimed he had murdered Kibbe to avenge his victims. He has been charged with first degree murder with special circumstances for killing Kibbe, albeit prosecutors said they will not seek a death sentence against him.

On March 3, the Amador County Sheriff's Office released the results of Kibbe's autopsy report, showing that he had died from manual strangulation.

Known victims 
 Lou Ellen Burleigh, 21, met Kibbe for an interview on September 10, 1977. She met him again the next morning and never returned home. Kibbe eventually confessed to raping and murdering her, and after 34 years her body was found.
 Lora Rena Heedick, 21, a hitchhiker and prostitute, was last seen getting into a car with a white, middle-aged man on April 20, 1986. Her body was found near Sacramento on September 6, 1986.
 Barbara Ann Scott, 29, was found strangled beneath a tree on a golf course in Antioch on July 3, 1986.
 Stephanie Brown, 19, was found sexually assaulted and strangled to death in a drainage ditch in San Joaquin County on July 15, 1986. A pair of unusual scissors were found near her body.
 Charmaine Sabrah, 26, was found strangled on November 9, 1986 in Ione. She was last seen on August 17, 1986, accepting a ride from a stranger after the car she and her mother were in broke down on I-5.
 Katherine Kelly Quinones, 25, was found strangled near the Pope Creek Bridge at Lake Berryessa on December 21, 1986. Her body was identified through fingerprints as Traci Lynn Gobel; one of the 17 aliases used by Quinones.
 Karen Louise Finch, 25, vanished on June 14, 1987. Seven days later, her body was found in a Sloughhouse ditch. She had been sexually assaulted and her throat was slashed; duct tape was found in her hair.
 Darcie Renée Frackenpohl, 17, a Seattle runaway working as a prostitute in Sacramento, was found strangled on September 19, 1987 in South Lake Tahoe. She was last seen around August 23, 1987.

In Media 
Kibbe's forensic evidence used in his conviction is reported on an episode of the series Forensic Files, "Knot for Everyone" (aired: October 1998).

Discovery channel tv show The New Detectives covered the murder of Darcie Frackenpohl in the episode titled Scattered Clues (aired on October 19, 1999)

In 2002 the television show I, Detective aired an episode focusing on the murder of Stephanie Brown.

MSNBC released the documentary "Profiling Evil" where forensic psychiatrist Park Dietz interviews Kibbe in prison (aired: November 18, 2012). The interview was part of Kibbe's plea deal to avoid a death penalty.

The series On the Case with Paula Zahn dedicated an episode on Kibbe's crimes titled "Deadly Offer". The episode aired on May 8, 2016.  Series host Paula Zahn interviewed family members of the victims, detectives, criminalist, the prosecutor, and a forensic pathologist.

Australian tv program 35 Serial Killers the World Wants to Forget also look into the case of Kibbe by the perspective of lead detective Ray Biondi (aired on March 6, 2020)

Oxygen Network aired The Mark of a Killer: Pattern of Murder about the Kibbe case on February 17, 2019.

See also 
 List of serial killers in the United States

References

Further reading

External links 
  — Season 3, Episode 2: "Knot for Everyone", by FilmRise

1939 births
1977 murders in the United States
1986 murders in the United States
1987 murders in the United States
2021 deaths
2021 murders in the United States
20th-century American criminals
American male criminals
American murderers of children
American people convicted of murder
American people who died in prison custody
American prisoners sentenced to life imprisonment
American rapists
American serial killers
Criminals from California
Criminals of the San Francisco Bay Area
Deaths by strangulation in the United States
Male murder victims
Male serial killers
People convicted of murder by California
People murdered in California
Place of birth missing
Prisoners sentenced to life imprisonment by California
Prisoners who died in California detention
Serial killers murdered in prison custody
Violence against women in the United States